The bronchial veins are small vessels that return blood from the larger bronchi and structures at the roots of the lungs.  The right side drains into the azygos vein, while the left side drains into the left superior intercostal vein or the accessory hemiazygos vein. Bronchial veins are thereby part of the bronchial circulation, carrying waste products away from the cells that constitute the lungs.

The bronchial veins are counterparts to the bronchial arteries. However, they only carry ~13% of the blood flow of the bronchial arteries.  The remaining blood is returned to the heart via the pulmonary veins.

See also
 Bronchial arteries
 Pulmonary arteries
 Pulmonary veins

References

External links
 

Veins of the torso